Bogdanovka is a rural locality in Bolshezhirovsky Selsoviet Rural Settlement, Fatezhsky District, Kursk Oblast, Russia. Population:

Geography 
The village is located on the Nikovets Brook (a right tributary of the Ruda in the basin of the Svapa), 91 km from the Russia–Ukraine border, 35.5 km north-west of Kursk, 17 km south-west of the district center – the town Fatezh, 12.5 km from the selsoviet center – Bolshoye Zhirovo.

 Climate
Bogdanovka has a warm-summer humid continental climate (Dfb in the Köppen climate classification).

Transport 
Bogdanovka is located 11 km from the federal route  Crimea Highway as part of the European route E105, 34.5 km from the road of regional importance  (Kursk – Ponyri), 14 km from the road  (Fatezh – 38K-018), on the road of intermunicipal significance  (M2 "Crimea Highway" – Kromskaya), 32 km from the nearest railway halt 433 km (railway line Lgov I — Kursk).

The rural locality is situated 39.5 km from Kursk Vostochny Airport, 152 km from Belgorod International Airport and 237 km from Voronezh Peter the Great Airport.

References

Notes

Sources

Rural localities in Fatezhsky District